Secoviridae is a family of viruses in the order Picornavirales. Plants serve as natural hosts. There are 8 genera and 86 species in this family, one of which is unassigned to a genus. The family was created in 2009 with the grouping of families Sequiviridae, now dissolved, and Comoviridae, now subfamily Comovirinae, along with the then unassigned genera Cheravirus, Sadwavirus, and Torradovirus.

Taxonomy
The family includes the following genera (-virinae denotes subfamily and -virus denotes genus):
 Comovirinae
 Comovirus
 Fabavirus
 Nepovirus
 Unassigned to a subfamily:
 Cheravirus
 Sadwavirus
 Sequivirus
 Torradovirus
 Waikavirus

Lastly, one species is unassigned to a genus: Strawberry latent ringspot virus.

Structure
Viruses in Secoviridae are non-enveloped, with icosahedral geometries, and T=pseudo3 symmetry. The diameter is around 25-30 nm. Genomes are linear and segmented, bipartite, around 24-7kb in length.

Life cycle
Viral replication is cytoplasmic. Entry into the host cell is achieved by penetration into the host cell. Replication follows the positive stranded RNA virus replication model. Positive stranded RNA virus transcription is the method of transcription. The virus exits the host cell by tubule-guided viral movement.
Plants serve as the natural host. Transmission routes are mechanical.

Evolution
The subfamily Comovirinae evolved  ~1,000 years ago with extant species diversifying between 50 and 250 years ago. This time period coincides with the intensification of agricultural practices in industrial societies.

The mutation rate has been estimated to be 9.29×10−3 to 2.74×10−3 subs/site/year.

References

External links

 'ICTV Online (10th) Report: Secoviridae''
 Viralzone: Secoviridae
 UniProt Taxonomy 

 
Virus families
Picornavirales